commonly known as  is a Japanese professional football club based in Hamamatsu, Shizuoka. They currently play in the Japan Football League, the country's 4th tier of professional league football.

History 
The club was founded as Honda Motor, Honda works team in 1971. They were promoted to the Japan Soccer League Division 2 in 1975 and to the JSL Division 1 in 1981; the closest they came to the title was in 1985–86 and 1990–91 seasons, when they finished in third place. In 1991 they also made the finals of both the Japan Soccer League Cup and Konica Cup, but lost both times. They also made the Emperor's Cup semi-finals in 1990 and 1991. They stayed in the top flight until the conclusion of the league in 1992.

In the early 1990s, the club considered the possibilities of turning professional and participating in J. League. They sought the merger with their sister club Honda Motor Sayama F.C. and Urawa was chosen as a possible hometown. However, they failed to persuade the owner Honda Motor who insisted they should abide by their principle to concentrate on their core business of automobile manufacturing.

As a result of this decision, many players left the club. They played in the newly formed Japan Football League Division 1 in 1992 and finished 9th out of 10. They were relegated to Division 2 where they won the championship in 1993. The 2 divisions of the JFL were merged in 1994 and the club joined the league.

In 1996, they won the championship in the JFL. Around that time, the club made the second effort to be a professional club. They acquired associate membership in J. League under new name Acute Hamamatsu but the inadequate stadium and insufficient local support (the closest professional club is Júbilo Iwata, formerly part of Yamaha Motor Corporation), forced them to give it up. Iwata was a common derby foe in the JSL and their fixtures were known as Tenryu-side Derby (天竜川決戦).

In 1999, the JFL was reorganised as the new JFL. They have been playing in the league since its inception.

J's Gatekeeper 
Honda F.C. does not intend to be promoted to the J. League due to the mandatory loss of corporate backing, although they have been always considered one of the JFL title contenders. They provide a big hurdle for those independent sides who wish to gain promotion. In order to achieve this goal, these teams need to finish in the top four in the league. Honda perennially occupying one of these spots makes their challenge even more difficult. Supporters of these clubs have dubbed Honda F.C. as J's Gatekeeper (the Gatekeeper of J. League) with respect and some resentment.

Honda F.C., having played in the old Japan Soccer League in the past but never contending for the title, has in 2007 given some J1 teams a run for their money in the Emperor's Cup, reaching the quarterfinals after disposing of former champions Kashiwa Reysol and top contenders Nagoya Grampus (their first quarterfinals since 1991). They were nevertheless defeated by J1 champions Kashima Antlers on 22 December. The 2008 cup did not go well for them, as they were eliminated by Sagan Tosu 4–0 in the third round, but they still won the JFL championship.

Stadium 

The club's home arena is the Honda Miyakoda Soccer Stadium located in Kita-ku, Hamamatsu. It is owned by Honda Motor Company. The stadium was redeveloped in 1996. This reconstruction included the building of a new mobile platform (1,000 seats) and corner floodlights. The stadium now holds 4,000 spectators.

League & cup record 

Key
 Pos. = Position in league; P = Games played; W = Games won; D = Games drawn; L = Games lost; F = Goals scored; A = Goals conceded; GD = Goals difference; Pts = Points gained
 Source: JFL, Honda FC website

Honours 
 Japan Soccer League Division 2
 Champions (2): 1978, 1980
 Japan Football League (former)
 Champions (1): 1996
 Japan Football League (former) Division 2
 Champions (1): 1993
 Japan Football League
 Champions (8): 2001, 2002, 2006, 2008, 2014, 2016, 2017, 2018
 Runners-up (4): 1999, 2000, 2003, 2004
 All Japan Senior Football Championship
 Winners (2): 1974, 1999
 Konica Cup
 Runners-up (1): 1991

Current squad
As of 9 March 2023.

Coaching staff

Managerial history

Kit evolution

References

External links 
  

 
Football clubs in Japan
Japan Soccer League clubs
Association football clubs established in 1971
Sports teams in Shizuoka Prefecture
Honda
1971 establishments in Japan
Japan Football League (1992–1998) clubs
Japan Football League clubs
Hamamatsu
Works association football clubs in Japan